Hoseynabad Rural District is a rural district (dehestan) in Mehrdasht District, Najafabad County, Isfahan Province, Iran. At the 2006 census, its population was 5,440, in 1,372 families.  The rural district has 7 villages.

References 

Rural Districts of Isfahan Province
Najafabad County